The Wentworthville Magpies, colloquially known as Wenty, are a rugby league team based in the suburb of Wentworthville in Sydney's Western Suburbs.  Founded in 1963 (or 1937), the club has competed in various Sydney district competitions and, since 2003, the semi-professional Ron Massey Cup and Sydney Shield competitions in NSW, Australia. The club also fielded a team in the Canterbury Cup NSW as part of a joint-venture with the Parramatta Eels between 2008 and 2019 acting as Parramatta's feeder club.

Inter-District/Second Division/Metropolitan Cup

During this period  Wentworthville ("The Magpies") was the most successful club at this level of competition, competing in every grand final of the Second Division between 1964 and 1973 (winning all but the 1966 and 1972 grand finals).

The club won a total of 8 premierships during the history of the Second Division (including 5 in a row between 1967 and 1971). Due to their domination of the competition 'Wenty' was widely considered the best candidate for promotion to the NSWRL Premiership when two positions were made available for the 1967 competition. Due to their proximity to Parramatta, where a Premiership club was established in 1946, the Magpies were overlooked.

When the Second Division was reorganised as the Metropolitan League in 1974 the Magpies left the competition to play in the Illawarra Rugby League competition, believing they could find greater competition on the South Coast.  They failed to repeat this success in the Illawarra competition.

The club returned to the Sydney competition when it was reorganised as the Metropolitan Cup in 1990, winning premierships in 1998 and 1999.

Wills Cup

Wentworthville had one opportunity to compete against Sydney's first-grade clubs when they were invited, as champions of the 1969 Second Division, to compete in the 1970 NSWRL pre-season competition (then known as the Wills Cup).  Second Division 1969 runners-up University of Sydney were also invited to participate.

Wentworthville finished 12th (above Penrith Panthers and University) in the competition with 1 win and 3 losses and a points differential of −21.  They played games against Parramatta, University, Penrith and Western Suburbs.  Their win came against local rivals Parramatta, winning 12 – 8 at Cumberland Oval but they failed to defeat fellow Second Division club, University, narrowly losing 19 – 17.

Despite a promising win against a top-flight side the experiment of inviting Second Division teams to participate in first-grade competitions was not considered a success and was never repeated.

Jim Beam Cup/Bundaberg Red Cup/Ron Massey Cup

The Wentworthville Magpies joined the NSWRL Jim Beam Cup in its first year in 2003 and were runners-up to The Entrance Tigers in the 2003 Grand Final. In 2009 they won the Bundaberg Red Grand Final against the Cabramatta 'Two' Blues.  Since 2009, Wentworthville have won the competition another five times in 2010, 2012, 2013, 2017 and 2018.

NSWRL State League/Premier League

In 2007, Parramatta Eels announced that they would form a joint-venture with the club to play in the NSWRL Premier League/State League. The Team includes players from both the Eels and the Magpies from the Bundaberg Red Cup. The joint-venture won their first Premiership in 2008, defeating the Newtown Jets in Golden Point Extra Time, with the match duration lasting in excess of 100 minutes.

During the 2008 season, such names as internationals Joe Galuvao, Eric Grothe, and Krisnan Inu all donned the famous black & white jersey of the Wenty club, along with fellow regular first graders Ben Smith, Tim Smith, Junior Paulo, Weller Hauraki & Todd Lowrie among others.

The Magpies and Eels once again joined forces in the NSW Cup in 2009. In addition, the Magpies also fielded a team in the Bundaberg Red Cup (formerly the Jim Beam Cup), with both competitions running concurrently.

Since making the grand final in 2008, Wentworthville have been competitive in The Intrust Super Premiership NSW finishing 2011 in 6th place, 2012 in 4th place, 2013 in 8th place, 2014 in 4th place, 2015 as wooden spooners and in 2016 they finished 9th.

In the 2017 NSW Cup season, Wentworthville missed out on the finals for the third straight year finishing 9th on the table and missing out on the finals by 3 points.
In the 2018 NSW Cup season, Wentworthville finished in 10th place on the table missing out on the finals by 2 competition points.

In October 2018, Nathan Cayless resigned as head coach of the club.  The Parramatta Eels also announced that they would be ending their partnership with Wentworthville after the conclusion of the 2019 season.  Parramatta CEO Bernie Gurr spoke to the media saying "Out of the review we found if we want to be a successful development club we need to have the Parramatta Eels in the ISP. Then you've got a clear one-club mentality".
On 2 November 2018, former Parramatta reserve grade and Wentworthville coach Rip Taylor was announced as the new head coach for the 2019 season.

On 22 April 2019, Wentworthville played in the first ever game at the new Western Sydney Stadium which was against Western Suburbs with Wentworthville running out winners 20-14.  Wentworthville player Bevan French scored the first ever try at the new venue.

Wentworthville finished the 2019 Canterbury Cup NSW season in eighth position on the table and qualified for the finals.  Wentworthville then produced upset victories over Penrith, Canterbury-Bankstown and South Sydney to reach the 2019 Canterbury Cup NSW grand final.

In the grand final against Newtown, Wentworthville would go on to lose the match 20-15 at Bankwest Stadium after extra-time.

Notable Juniors
Also see :Category:Wentworthville Magpies players

Notable First Grade Players that have played at Wentworthville Magpies include:

Phil Gould (1976–1986 Penrith Panthers, Newtown Jets, Canterbury-Bankstown & South Sydney Rabbitohs)
Lew Zivanovic (1979–86 Penrith Panthers)
Scott Pethybridge (1994-02 Penrith Panthers, Norths, Auckland Warriors)
Nathan Cayless (1997-10 Parramatta Eels)
Steven Crouch (1999-04 Parramatta Eels, Manly-Warringah & Sydney)
John Wilson (2000–08 Parramatta Eels, West Tigers & Catalans Dragons)
Jason Cayless (2000–10 Parramatta Eels, Sydney, St. Helens & West Tigers)
Chad Robinson (2000–09 Parramatta Eels, Sydney & Harlequins FC)
Paul Gallen (2001–2019 Cronulla-Sutherland)
Taniela Lasalo (2009– Parramatta Eels)
Jorge Tafua (2012– Manly-Warringah, Wakefield Trinity)
Ken Sio (2012– Parramatta Eels, Newcastle Knights, Salford Red Devils, Hull Kingston Rovers)
Will Skelton (2013– NSW Waratahs)
John Asiata (2014– North Queensland Cowboys, Leigh)
Manaia Cherrington (2015–2016) Wests Tigers)
Fabian Goodall (2016– Manly-Warringah)
Ryan Matterson (2016– Sydney Roosters, Wests Tigers, Parramatta)
Matt Eisenhuth (2017– Wests Tigers)
James Maloney (2009– Melbourne, Auckland Warriors, Eastern Suburbs, Cronulla-Sutherland, Penrith Panthers, Catalans Dragons Catalans Dragons)
Haze Dunster (2020- Parramatta Eels)
Tom Amone (2019- South Sydney Rabbitohs & West Tigers)

Honours
Intrust Super Premiership NSW
 Winners (1) –: 2008
Ron Massey Cup (and previous third tier competitions)
 Winners (17) – Record: 1964, 1965, 1967, 1968, 1969, 1970, 1971, 1973, 1998, 1999, 2009, 2010, 2012, 2013, 2017, 2018, 2019
 Minor Premiers (13) -: 1964, 1965, 1966, 1968, 1969, 1970, 1971, 1997, 1998, 2009, 2014, 2018, 2019
Sydney Shield
 Winners (2) – : 2012, 2015
 Minor Premiers -: 2015
 Second Division Reserve Grade
 Winners (6) – : 1964, 1965, 1966, 1968, 1969, 1970
 Minor Premiers (6) -: 1965, 1968, 1969, 1970, 1971, 1972

Playing Record in NSW Competitions

Second Tier
The Wentworthville-Parramatta joint venture participated in second-tier, NSWRL competitions for twelve seasons.

Third Tier

Fourth Tier

See also

National Rugby League reserves affiliations
List of rugby league clubs in Australia
Rugby league in New South Wales

References

External links

Rugby league teams in Sydney
Rugby clubs established in 1937
1937 establishments in Australia
Ron Massey Cup